Barbara Crawford Johnson (1925 - 2005) was an American aeronautical engineer.
She was the one woman in NASA's engineering team that participated in arrival on the Moon. She conducted significant and important studies on flight dynamics, missile design, wind tunnels, performance analysis, and aerodynamics. In 1968, she was appointed the highest position ever achieved by a woman in her department: manager of the Apollo Program.

Early life 
Barbara, who went by "Bobbie" most of her life, was from the small town of Sandoval, Illinois, from a family of six children.

She had a fascination of flying, and inspired by women like Amelia Earhart. She was known to pass time by watching planes take off and land and interview pilots about how to fly planes. Her curious mind most likely stemmed from her education-oriented family.

As Barbara grew through her teenage years, she discovered her love for math and science. A local engineer who was constructing Sandoval's new high school stayed with Barbara's family. This engineer taught Barbara about floor plans, engineering terminology, and surveying. Barbara's brother became an electrical engineer at Naval Academy, which further cemented her interest in engineering. Barbara's parents were in full support of her aspiration in the engineering field, and Barbara stated it was because she wasn't placed into a box due to her gender. "I didn't know that girls didn't take it," noted Barbara, referring to engineering. "My dad never said anything: he thought it was a great idea."

Education 

The finances of college was a challenge for her family. Barbara ultimately enrolled in the University of Illinois in 1943 due to scholarships and the low in-state tuition. At the time, the university did not yet offer aeronautical engineering degrees, so Barbara started with general engineering to provide her a solid technical understanding and background in all general engineering disciplines. Barbara struggled with oppression as a woman in engineering, and was often told she would never find a job because no one would want to hire a female engineer. The discrimination caused her to doubt her decisions, and she considered transferring to business, but her parents encouraged her to stick with engineering.

In her free time while in college, Barbara was active in the Air Force Base in Rantoul, Illinois and eventually learned to fly on her own. Her on-campus professors, Professor Spring and Professor Vawter had tremendously encouraged her on her path to becoming an engineer. Additionally, she won a bid to become an at-large student senator, acquiring more votes than the candidate running for president.

In 1946, in just three years, Barbara Crawford Johnson became the first woman to earn a Bachelor's degree in general engineering from the University of Illinois. She immediately had three different job offers: to stay and teach at the University while pursuing graduate work, to move East and build bridges, or to take a job with North American Aviation in California (which later became Space Division of Rockwell International).

Work 
With her love for flying, Barbara chose the North American Aviation job, even with her feelings of inadequacy in the beginning. Barbara's worries stemmed from being placed in an aviation position when her background was general engineering.

Her first assignment with her job was in aerophysics and aerodynamics. "I have no idea why they put me where they did," said Barbara. "I didn't even really know what a Mach number was." The job was simple yet tedious, and Barbara spoke with her supervisor about placing her on a different assignment. "I am an engineer, and I want a real engineer's job," Barbara told him. Her supervisor laughed at her before walking out of the room, and Barbara thought she had been fired. However, he returned with her manager, and they assigned her to a new and challenging job: supersonic inlet design for a ramjet.

The preliminary designers Barbara got to work with taught her a lot and opened up more career opportunities for her, including flight dynamic projects for Dyna-Soar, the recovery of hypersonic gliders, lunar reentry vehicle research, and orbital rendezvous. She continued to learn as she took graduate classes at UCLA to keep up with the challenging projects. She borrowed her bosses car to drive to UCLA and take her classes.

She worked in the aerospace industry for thirty-six years, only taking time off when she and her husband had their son.

Projects 

 The Navaho missile: Supersonic inlet design for a ramjet was what led Barbara to the Navaho program. She used the Talman's method solving differential equations and plotting graphs following pressure lines and so forth. The Navaho project was a boost cruise missile, and Barbara's knowledge grew in boost rockets and flight mechanics. Barbara believes it was in this program she calculated the first boost trajectory that anybody in the country had ever calculated by hand. Although Barbara started working on the project's second phase, the Mach 2.75 cruise missile, it evolved into her overseeing the entire aerodynamic performance.
 The Hound Dog air-to-ground missile: Barbara recalls fifteen or twenty different combinations of configurations for the stand off air-to-ground strategic missile that was named after Elvis Presley's hit song. Barbara was asked to brief thirty to forty officers on the performance as a travel authorization, which was taboo, as she was female. "There was kind of a barrier about women traveling. You know, they didn’t know anything about that," stated Barbara. After returning to work on Monday, one of the colonels had thanked them on their briefing, and she was called into the chief engineer's office to give her a form that woman travelers could be signed off by the president of the division. "It kind of broke the ice," said Barbra. "I had more travel than I wanted after that."
 The Apollo Lunar Landing Program: Working on trajectories and aeroheating, Barbara worked around the clock, night and day, on the Apollo Lunar Landing Program. She worked with co-workers Art Frank and Elvin Knotts, and worked heavily with Autonetics. Her and her group initiated elliptical orbits, as opposed to circular. She had many flight techniques meetings, and preparing for failures or double failures operations.
 Lunar Landing: Barbara believes her team should have mapped the moon for future explorers so that the moon could be used as a base, and a launch facility.
 Skylab: Skylab was a space rocket launched and operated by NASA, and the only space station the US has operated exclusively. Barbara worked on the command service module.
 Apollo-Soyuz: In 1975, this was the first join US-Soviet space flight where they docked an Apollo command service module with the Soviet Soyuz 19. Barbara recalled the Soviets having a two-gas fourteen PSI system, and the US having a one-gas 5 PSI system.
 Space Shuttle: Barbara was responsible for Shuttle system and Orbiter Project mission related analysis. She worked on trajectories, very similar work to what she did with the Apollo. It was on the Space Shuttle she worked with astronaut and command module pilot for Apollo 8 Fred Haise. Haise coordinated for NASA and Barbara coordinated for Rockwell the requirements for the mission.

Awards
Throughout her exceptional career, she received several awards within the world of engineering. 
 1973: NASA's astronaut Fred Haise Jr. wrote Barbara a letter of commendation.
 1974: Society of Women Engineers Achievement Award
 1975: The Distinguished Alumni Merit Award, University of Illinois College of Engineering
 1976: Dirk Brouwer Award, Americal Astronautical Society

She additionally received a medallion from NASA to commemorate her contribution to the Apollo 11 mission.

References 

American women engineers
21st-century American engineers
University of Illinois alumni
NASA people
Apollo program
21st-century American women